$, also known as Dollar$, Dollars or $ (Dollars), and in the UK as The Heist, is a 1971 American comedy film starring Warren Beatty and Goldie Hawn, written and directed by Richard Brooks and produced by M.J. Frankovich. The supporting cast includes Gert Fröbe, Robert Webber and Scott Brady. The film is about a bank security consultant (Beatty) who develops a scheme with a prostitute, Dawn Divine (Hawn), to steal several criminals' money from a bank vault.

The film was partly shot in Hamburg, West Germany, which forms the primary location of the film and was supported by the Hamburg Art Museum and Bendestorf Studios. The film's music is composed and produced by Quincy Jones, and the soundtrack features performances by the Don Elliott Voices, Little Richard, Roberta Flack and Doug Kershaw. The title $ appears in the opening credits only in the form of a giant character, as would be used in a sign, being transported by a crane. $ was distributed by Columbia Pictures.

Plot 
Set in Hamburg, West Germany, several criminals take advantage of the West German bank privacy laws to use safe deposit boxes in a West German bank to store large amounts of illicit cash. These include a Las Vegas mobster as well as a ruthless drug smuggler known as the Candy Man and a crooked overbearing U.S. Army sergeant and his meek-mannered partner the Major, who conspire on a big heroin and LSD smuggling score. Joe Collins (Warren Beatty), an American bank security consultant, has been spying on them and makes mysterious and elaborate preparations to steal their money (totaling more than $1.5 million) with the help of Dawn Divine (Goldie Hawn), a hooker with a heart of gold.

Joe has Dawn phone in a bomb threat to the bank president, Mr. Kessel (Gert Fröbe), to create a diversion. Joe locks himself inside the bank vault with a gold bar normally displayed in the lobby to supposedly save it. The bank is closed and evacuated while Joe uses duplicate keys to empty the criminals' three safe deposit boxes into Dawn's large-size deposit box. (It is implied that Joe had obtained the necessary bank information and secretly copied the criminals' keys while they were engaged in sexual trysts with Dawn.) Despite the fact that Kessel insists on burning through the wall to rescue Joe instead of waiting for the time lock to open, Joe succeeds in the heist and is hailed as a hero for "preventing" the robbery of the gold bar.

The next day, the three criminals, one by one, discover that their boxes are empty, and thus they cannot complete their illegal schemes, nor do they dare to go to the police to report the thefts, since they would then risk revealing their own dishonest pasts. The Las Vegas mobster flees the country while the Sarge, his partner the Major, and the Candy Man search Dawn Divine's apartment, as she was their common link, and find clues that connect her to Joe. Sarge calls Kessel to get Joe's home address, but Joe is quickly tipped off by Kessel and he hurriedly sends Dawn to the train station with a suitcase packed with her take — $765,000 — promising to meet her later someplace out of the country.

A long climactic chase begins as Dawn gives the Major the slip at the train station while the Candy Man and the Sarge chase Joe across a rail yard and through the Elbe Tunnel. Joe escapes on a car carrier truck, lugging his suitcase, but the Candy Man and the Sarge follow and catch up in the morning at a frozen lake in the countryside, where the Candy Man crashes his car through the ice and drowns.

Joe escapes again by hopping a train, but during the night the Sarge catches up to him, only to find that Joe's suitcase contains nothing but a bottle of champagne and wads of newspaper. They conclude that Dawn double-crossed Joe by repacking the suitcases (and thus taking all the money for herself) while he was getting the car, and the Sarge proposes a plan to Joe to go after Dawn together. However, upon swallowing a mouthful of the champagne, the Sarge instantly goes into violent convulsions and falls down dead. The bottle was one of two that the Candy Man had filled with a solution of concentrated LSD to sneak through customs earlier in the film. It's clear from Joe's reaction that he had no idea of the bottle's contents, and was just about to imbibe himself.

An epilogue shows Dawn staying at the Hotel del Coronado, joyfully driving a gleaming new yellow Corvette, and cuddling in bed with an unseen someone. The other suitcase is sitting near the bed, and Joe's bomber jacket hangs on the coat rack. Dawn calmly explains to Joe that she was certain that the criminals wouldn't kill him and leave them with no way to get at the money; Dawn had planned all along to still share the money with Joe as they'd originally arranged, and so she had merely taken the money in order to keep it from anyone who'd pursued Joe. The poisoned champagne bottle she left for him is not discussed; she'd likely had no idea that its contents had been switched for LSD, either.

Cast

 Warren Beatty as Joe Collins
 Goldie Hawn as Dawn Divine
 Gert Fröbe as Mr. Kessel
 Robert Webber as Attorney (referred to as Mr. North)
 Scott Brady as Sarge
 Arthur Brauss as Candy Man
 Robert Stiles as Major
 Wolfgang Kieling as Granich

 Robert Herron as Bodyguard
 Christiane Maybach as Helga
 Hans Hutter as Karl
 Monica Stender as Berta
 Horst Hesslein as Bruno
 Wolfgang Kuhlman as Furcoat
 Klaus Schichan as Knifeman

Production 
Principal photography for $ took place at Bendestorf Studio is Hamburg, West Germany from early January to early May 1971, and location shooting took place in that city as well.  The building depicted as the exterior of the bank was actually the Kunsthalle, Hamburg's principal museum of art. The route followed in the chase scenes realistically takes the viewer through many of the city's locales. Other locations in Hamburg include the Reeperbahn — the city's red-light district — and the Salambo Cabaret nightclub.

Other filming locations included Munich, Norway, the Pacific Coast Highway and the Hotel Del Coronado in San Diego, California.

Warren Beatty was injured while filming the train sequence, which caused him to miss at least two days of shooting.

Tribute
The scene where Joe tells Dawn there has never been such a robbery as what he is planning is a homage to the scene in Double Indemnity when the insurance investigator played by Edward G. Robinson lectures his boss that there has never been an instance of someone committing suicide by jumping off the back of a slow-moving train.

Soundtrack
The soundtrack to the film was composed and produced by Quincy Jones, with performances by Little Richard, Roberta Flack and Doug Kershaw, in addition to featuring the Don Elliot Voices throughout the score. Among Jones' bouncy, funky instrumental songs, his track "Snow Creatures" has been heavily sampled by numerous hip hop artists, including Gang Starr and Common Sense.

Little Richard sings "Money Is" and "Do It to It", both with music and lyrics by Quincy Jones, while Roberta Flack sings "When You're Smiling (The Whole World Smiles with You)", with music and lyrics by Mark Fisher, Joe Goodwin and Larry Shay.

Release and reception
The premiere of the film took place in New York City on December 15, 1971, and it was released in theaters across the United States on December 17, 1971.  The Los Angeles premiere was on December 22.

Roger Ebert gave the film three stars out of four and praised it as a "slick and breakneck caper movie that runs like a well-oiled thrill." He praised the performance of Beatty, describing him as "the best con man in movies, certainly since Clark Gable died. He is filled with deals, angles, things he has to pull you over in a corner to whisper. He can make you rich tomorrow, and himself, too, one of these days. And he has an unusual kind narcissism — unusual for an actor. He isn't narcissistic about himself, but about his style; he's in love with conning people." Roger Greenspun of The New York Times wrote that the film boasts "an attractive cast, some clever dialogue (also by Brooks), and lots of suspense — at least, until the chase begins and never seems to end, and you wish that everyone would go home and get some rest ... '$' is actually a decent short film that has been made long by the most predictable and least ingenious of means." Arthur D. Murphy of Variety found the film "[f]ar too leisurely in plot and pacing," suggesting that "Brooks maybe is too serious a filmmaker for this sort of thing. He wants his characters to have depth and motivation, but the principle does not work well herein." Charles Champlin of the Los Angeles Times called it a "crackling good crime-chase-suspense story. Its considerable pleasure is that it sets us up solidly in a colorful, unfamiliar but unquestionably real place — Hamburg, Germany — and plays its ingenious charades absolutely as if they were part of the teeming life of that city." Gene Siskel of the Chicago Tribune gave the film two-and-a-half stars out of four and wrote that it has a "clever premise" and that Beatty and Hawn were "pleasant performers," but "Brooks' script continually interrupts its mood of a slick caper film with slapstick humor. '$' tries to be both a comedy and a caper, and manages to be neither."

A Channel 4 review of the film in the UK gave it a 4 out of 5 rating, and, like Ebert, noted the pace of the directing and script by Brooks, describing it as "cutting more rapidly than usual, he kept the action moving fairly entertainingly for most of the movie, with includes a long and spectacular car chase". However, unlike Ebert, critic Christopher Null believed the following of the film tired after the first hour, remarking that, "Beatty and Hawn carry this fun little heist/comedy picture for the first hour, but then the whole affair gets a little tiring".  He did, however, rate the film 3.5 out of 5.

Home video 
The film was released on DVD in 2008, concurrently with the CD re-release of the film's soundtrack, which had previously been released on CD in 2001 by Warner Bros. Records, Inc.

See also
 List of American films of 1971

References

External links
 
 
 
 
 

1971 films
1970s crime comedy films
1970s heist films
American crime comedy films
American heist films
Columbia Pictures films
1970s English-language films
Films scored by Quincy Jones
Films about bank robbery
Films directed by Richard Brooks
Films set in Hamburg
Films set in West Germany
Films shot in Germany
1971 comedy films
1970s American films